Era Independent School District is a public school district based in the community of Era, Texas (United States).

The district is located in southwestern Cooke County and extends into a small portion of northern Denton County.

Era ISD has one school that serves students in grades Kindergarten through twelve.

In 2002, the school district was rated "recognized" by the Texas Education Agency.

References

External links
Era ISD

School districts in Cooke County, Texas
School districts in Denton County, Texas
Public K-12 schools in Texas